Huseby is a surname. Notable people with the surname include:

Dagfin Huseby (1922–2010), Norwegian wrestler
Gunnar Huseby (1923–1995), Icelandic track and field athlete
Magnar G. Huseby (1928–2011), Norwegian engineer and politician 
Olaf Huseby (1856–1942), Norwegian-American bookseller and publisher